Of the 24 Illinois incumbents, 18 were re-elected.

See also 
 List of United States representatives from Illinois
 United States House of Representatives elections, 1972

1972
Illinois
1972 Illinois elections